Horatio Gates Herrick (October 28, 1824 – April 18, 1904) was an American lawyer who served as sheriff of Essex County, Massachusetts.

Early life
Herrick was born on October 28, 1824, in Alfred, Maine, to Benjamin J. and Mary (Conant) Herrick. His uncle was Joshua Herrick.

Legal career
Herrick graduated from Bowdoin College in 1844. In 1847 he was admitted to the bar and began a law practice in North Berwick, Maine. Later that year he moved to Saugus, Massachusetts, and practiced law in Boston.

Civil War
In 1862, Herrick was appointed draft commissioner for Essex County by Governor John Albion Andrew. In May 1863 he was commissioned captain and provost marshal for the Sixth District of Massachusetts by United States Secretary of War Edwin M. Stanton. He was mustered out on October 15, 1865.

Political career
In November 1865, Herrick was elected sheriff of Essex County. He was reelected to nine consecutive three-year terms. In 1892 Herrick refused renomination. From 1871 to 1873 he was also a member of the Massachusetts Board of Prison Commissioners.

On January 1, 1866, Herrick moved to Lawrence, Massachusetts. There he served as a member of the school board. He was also the founding president of the Industrial School for Boys and a trustee of the Lawrence Savings Bank.

Personal life and death
Herrick married Isabella Sewell Paine, daughter of John Treat Paine and Mary E. Rice (Goodwin) Paine on August 23, 1848. They had three children, Frederick St. Clair Herrick (1850–1884), John St. Clair Herrick (1855–1855), and Alice Bigelow Herrick (1856–1856). Paine died on January 12, 1857, in Saugus at the age of 26.

Herrick was an active member of the Methodist Episcopal Church and served a president of the Methodist Episcopal Church of Saugus Centre's Sunday school. In Lawrence he was an active member of the Haverhill Street Church.

In his later years, Herrick resided with Isabel J. (Ball) Herrick, the widow of his son, Frederick St. Clair Herrick. He died on April 18, 1904, at their home in Lawrence.

Notes

1824 births
1904 deaths
19th-century American politicians
Bowdoin College alumni
Sheriffs of Essex County, Massachusetts
Massachusetts lawyers
Maine lawyers
Politicians from Lawrence, Massachusetts
People from Saugus, Massachusetts
People from Alfred, Maine
People of Massachusetts in the American Civil War